Thritthi Nonsrichai (born March 13, 1983, in Bangkok), simply known as Doy, is a Thai retired professional footballer who plays as a centre-back.

Honours

Clubs
Muangthong United
 Thai Premier League: 2012

External links
 Profile at Goal

1983 births
Living people
Thritthi Nonsrichai
Thritthi Nonsrichai
Association football defenders
Thritthi Nonsrichai
Thritthi Nonsrichai
Thritthi Nonsrichai
Thritthi Nonsrichai
Thritthi Nonsrichai
Thritthi Nonsrichai
Footballers at the 2006 Asian Games
Thritthi Nonsrichai